Nigger in the woodpile or nigger in the fence is a figure of speech originating in the United States meaning "some fact of considerable importance that is not disclosed—something suspicious or wrong".

Commonly used in the late 19th and early 20th centuries, its usage has since drastically declined owing to its use of the ethnic slur nigger, and use of the phrase by public figures has often been criticized owing to use of the slur in the term.

Origin 
Both the "fence" and "woodpile" variants developed about the same time in the period of 1840–1850, when the Underground Railroad was flourishing. The evidence is slight, but it is presumed that they were derived from actual instances of the concealment of fugitive slaves in their flight north under piles of firewood or within hiding places in stone walls.

Another possible origin comes from the practice of transporting pulpwood on special railroad cars. In the era of slavery, the pulpwood cars were built with an outer frame with the wood being stacked inside in moderately neat rows and stacks. However, given the nature of the cars, it was possible to smuggle persons in the pile itself, possibly giving rise to the term.

An 1886 article in the San Antonio Light attributed origin of the "fence" variant to an 1840s horse race in Mississippi, during which a person was hidden in a fence next to the racetrack in order to scare a favorited horse during the race.

Usage 
The idiom was once common in literature and film, and has also appeared in musical lyrics. Examples include:

Literature
In the 1891 novel Emmett Bonlore by Opie Read, a scene in a bar describes how a fiddle player, "Mr. Potts, yielding to a general clamor for 'Nigger on the Wood-pile' had begun to sound the first notes of that stirring piece of music..."

Zane Grey's 1921 novel The Mysterious Rider uses the expression twice to explain a situation in which facts were purposefully omitted. In the 1929 RKO film Street Girl, the phrase is spoken by Joseph Cawthorn, but it has been erased from the print that Turner Classic Movies shows.

In the original 1927 version of The Hardy Boys book The House on the Cliff, Frank Hardy uses the expression. It was removed when the story was revised in 1959.

In Chapter 3 of Absalom, Absalom (1936), William Faulkner uses the phrase when referring to the success of a cotton plantation: "... some among his fellow citizens who believed even yet that there was a nigger in the woodpile somewhere."

Agatha Christie used the phrase as the title of chapter 18 of the 1937 Hercule Poirot novel Dumb Witness, which was later published in the U.S. as Poirot Loses a Client. The chapter was later retitled "A Cuckoo in the Nest". A character also uses the phrase in Chapter 22 of her 1953 book After the Funeral. The phrase was also used by a character in early editions of Christie's novel And Then There Were None (originally released under the title Ten Little Niggers), but was changed in later editions to There's a fly in the ointment. In 1952, in the novel They Do It with Mirrors, published in the U.S. as Murder with Mirrors, she has a character use the phrase. It appears in editions published as late as 1985.  In her 1970 novel Passenger to Frankfurt, she has a character use the phrase in chapter 23.

The phrase is used in The Razor's Edge (1944) by Somerset Maugham. One of the American characters, on the brink of closing a business deal, says to the narrator, "I'll fly down to Texas to give the outfit the once-over, and you bet I'll keep my eyes peeled for a nigger in the woodpile before I cough up any ... dough."

Western author Louis L'Amour used a variant in Crossfire Trail (1954): "Now there seemed to be a larger African in the woodpile, or several of them."

The novel Marnie by Winston Graham first published in 1961 features the phrase but the Alfred Hitchcock adaptation does not.

The British mystery writer Dick Francis used it in chapter 18 of his first novel, 1962's Dead Cert.

Other writing
Dr. Seuss used the term in a 1929 print cartoon "Cross-Section of The World's Most Prosperous Department Store", wherein customers browse through a department store looking for items to make their lives more difficult. The panels show a series of scenarios based on popular figures of speech: a man with a net trying to catch a fly for his ointment, another looking at monkey wrenches to throw into his machinery, one examining haystacks with matching needles, and finally a man looking at a selection of people drawn with stereotypical black features for his woodpile.

Erle Stanley Gardner uses the phrase in several early Perry Mason mysteries, including The Case of the Velvet Claws (1933), The Case of the Stuttering Bishop (1936), and The Case of the Substitute Face (1938).

In the book Your Health: A Corrective System of Exercising that Revolutionizes the Entire Field of Physical Education (1934), Joseph Pilates used the phrase.

Computer scientist Edsger W. Dijkstra used the phrase in a published reply to referees conducting scholarly peer review, circa 1975.

Films
An American film comedy titled A Nigger in the Woodpile was released in 1904.

In the 1930 pre-Code comedy Not So Dumb, Marion Davies consistently and constantly convolutes common idioms and expressions. After finally finding misplaced billiard balls that she had used as darning eggs, she proudly exclaims, "I just knew there was a woodpile in the nigger when I couldn't find 'em."

A visual gag in the Looney Tunes animated cartoon Porky's Railroad from 1937 refers to the phrase.

W. C. Fields used variations of this phrase in two of his films: In You Can't Cheat an Honest Man (1939) he says there is "an Ubangi in the fuel supply", and in My Little Chickadee (1940) he says there is "an Ethiopian in the fuel supply".

In Harry Revier's 1938 film, Child Bride, the phrase is used in one scene where a character says "I knew you had a nigger in the woodpile."

Music
Old-time band Skillet Lickers recording a song called "Nigger in the Woodpile" in 1930.

In the song, "This Could Be True", Pat Kirkwood and Graham Payn sing the phrase in Noël Coward's 1950 musical Ace of Clubs.

English music group Supertramp used the phrase in the lyrics of their song "Potter" from their 1971 album Indelibly Stamped.

Another English band, 10cc, used the phrase in their song "The Second Sitting for the Last Supper" from their album The Original Soundtrack from 1975.

Contemporary use by public figures
The phrase declined in use during the 20th century, and now its occasional use by public figures has often been followed by controversy and apology. Examples include:

During Italia 90 coverage on BBC Sport, Sir Geoff Hurst, in discussion with Bob Wilson, used the expression whilst sitting next to Garth Crooks.

In 1994, judge Inge Bernstein used the term in a summation to a Liverpool county court jury. She immediately apologised. The plaintiff, who was black, brought a damages action to the Court of Appeal supported by Peter Herbert, the chair of the Society of Black Lawyers. The appeal was rejected in 1996, ruled as an inadvertent (but highly offensive and inappropriate) mistake which was immediately withdrawn, and one which did not refer to the plaintiff or prejudice the jury against him.

In July 2008, the leader of the Conservative Party, David Cameron, was urged to sack Conservative peer Lord Dixon-Smith, who said in the House of Lords that concerns about government housing legislation were "the nigger in the woodpile". Dixon-Smith said the phrase had "slipped out without my thinking", and that "It was common parlance when I was younger".

In July 2017, the phrase was again used by Conservative Party politician Anne Marie Morris who said that Brexit without a deal with the European Union was the "real nigger in the woodpile". She later said, "The comment was totally unintentional. I apologise unreservedly for any offence caused." However, she was suspended the same day by the party's chief whip, on the orders of the party leader, Prime Minister Theresa May. The Conservative Party whip was restored to Morris on 12 December 2017, one day before a crucial vote on the Brexit process. Although Morris voted with the Conservative Government, the Government was defeated by four votes.

In 2018, it was revealed that Irish race car driver and commentator Derek Daly had used the phrase in a radio interview in May 1983. Daly explained he was a foreign driver now in America, driving for an American team, with an American crew, and with an American sponsor—and that if things did not go well, he would be the only nigger in the woodpile. His comment caused an immediate uproar from people listening in Gasoline Alley as they warned him of the volatility of that phrase. Daly apologized and said the phrase had been an Irish colloquialism, and was not intended as a racial slur. Once it was revealed, Daly lost his commentator job. His son, who had not been born at the time the comments were made, also lost his sponsor for the weekend.

In 2019, the Australian Communications and Media Authority (ACMA) ruled that radio station 2GB breached the Commercial Radio Code of Practice when the broadcaster Alan Jones used a "racially charged phrase" during a segment in 2018. ACMA received numerous complaints after Jones used the controversial phrase in August 2018, while discussing the looming second Liberal Party of Australia leadership spill. "The nigger in the woodpile here, if one can use that expression – and I'm not going to yield to people who tell us that certain words in the language are forbidden – the person who's playing hard to get is Mathias Cormann", Jones told listeners. ACMA found that, while the phrase was widely considered racist, its use in the broadcast did not likely incite "hatred", "serious contempt" or "severe ridicule". 2GB's management agreed the term will not be used on-air again.

In November 2019, a Downing Street aide alleged that Prince Andrew, Duke of York, had used the phrase during a trade meeting.

In June 2020, a city councillor in Taupo, New Zealand,  was subject to official complaints and a code of conduct investigation after using the phrase in a council meeting.

In November 2021, the vice chairman of South Kesteven District Council in Lincolnshire, England, Councillor Ian Stokes, was suspended from his party and later resigned after using the phrase whilst chairing a governance and audit committee on 20 October.  The meeting had been broadcast live on YouTube and sparked a petition calling for his resignation.

See also 
 Elephant in the room
 The Dog in the Manger
 Wolf in sheep's clothing

References

Further reading 
Epistemology of the Woodpile, University of Toronto Quarterly (October 2002)
History News Network blog post about a 2003 controversy

External links 

Racist parody of Republican platform from 1860 Presidential campaign, in Harper's Weekly
Phrase used in 1918 advertisement for Patterson Publishing Company The Rotarian magazine

1840s neologisms
English phrases
Anti-African and anti-black slurs
Metaphors referring to people
Metaphors referring to objects
Obfuscation
Secrecy
Underground Railroad
American English idioms